County Cavan was a parliamentary constituency in Ireland, which from 1801 to 1885 returned two Members of Parliament (MPs) to the House of Commons of the United Kingdom of Great Britain and Ireland.

Boundaries
This constituency comprised the whole of County Cavan.

Members of Parliament
From 1801 to 1885 County Cavan was one constituency with two Members of Parliament who both represented the whole of the county.

Election results

Elections in the 1800s

Elections in the 1810s

Elections in the 1820s

John Maxwell-Barry succeeded as 5th Baron Farnham, causing a by-election.

Elections in the 1830s

Henry Maxwell succeeded to the peerage, becoming 7th Baron Farnham and causing a by-election.

Elections in the 1840s
Somerset Maxwell resigned, causing a by-election.

John Young was appointed a Commissioner of the Treasury, requiring a by-election.

Henry John Clements's death caused a by-election.

Elections in the 1850s

John Young was appointed Chief Secretary of Ireland, requiring a by-election.

John Young resigned after being appointed Lord High Commissioner of the Ionian Islands, causing a by-election.

Elections in the 1860s

Elections in the 1870s

Elections in the 1880s

References

The Parliaments of England by Henry Stooks Smith (1st edition published in three volumes 1844–50), 2nd edition edited (in one volume) by F.W.S. Craig (Political Reference Publications 1973).
.
The Anglo-Celt 150th Anniversary Souvenir Supplement (dated 30 May 1996).

Westminster constituencies in County Cavan (historic)
Constituencies of the Parliament of the United Kingdom established in 1801
Constituencies of the Parliament of the United Kingdom disestablished in 1885